Victoria Jane Foxcroft (born 9 March 1977) is a British Labour politician who has been the Member of Parliament (MP) for Lewisham Deptford since 2015.

Early life and career
She talked to Gloria De Piero on GB News about her experiences of abuse in her childhood.

Foxcroft studied for a Bachelor of Arts degree in Drama and Business Studies at De Montfort University between 1996 and 2000.

Foxcroft has been a Labour Party member since at least 1997, and has sat on the Party's National Policy Forum. From 2010 until May 2014 she was a local councillor for the Brockley ward on Lewisham Council.

In 2002, Foxcroft became an officer at the Amalgamated Engineering and Electrical Union (AEEU), continuing through the merger of the AEEU into Amicus in 2001, and through the merger of Amicus into Unite the Union in 2007. She was a research officer from 2002 to 2005; a political officer from 2005 to 2009, and a finance sector officer from 2009 until 2015.

Foxcroft has lived in Lewisham, Deptford since at least 2004.

Parliamentary career
Foxcroft contested the Lewisham Deptford constituency for the Labour Party at the 2015 general election. She won with a 60.25% share of the vote.

Foxcroft made her maiden speech in a debate on the Scotland Bill on 8 June 2015, in which she quoted lyrics from The Red Flag. After the first election of Jeremy Corbyn as Labour leader in September 2015, Foxcroft was appointed as a whip.

She supported Owen Smith in the 2016 Labour Party (UK) leadership election.

Foxcroft was re-elected at the 2017 snap general election with a 77% share of the vote.

In June 2019 Foxcroft was promoted to become Shadow Minister for Civil Society.

Foxcroft endorsed Lisa Nandy in the 2020 Labour Party leadership election.

Foxcroft asked what is thought to be the first ever question at Prime Minister's Questions in British Sign Language, bringing attention to the absence of a sign language interpreter at Boris Johnson's press briefings. While press briefings are broadcast with an on-screen interpreter, Foxcroft expressed concern about the lack of an on-platform interpreter. There have been several legal challenges to this end claiming the government is violating human rights law.

Views
In 2016, Foxcroft established the cross-party Youth Violence Commission, which she continues to chair.

In November 2018, Foxcroft said, "Sadly, the increase (in the number of young people killed in knife attacks) does not surprise me. You can't cut police, Sure Start, essential services in schools, access to mental health services and youth work, and not expect there to be a consequence. And beyond the tragic fatalities, there's an exponentially larger number of knife attacks that don't kill children but do create a climate of fear."

Foxcroft supports lowering the voting age to 16, co-chairing the APPG for Votes at 16.

She supported Remain in the EU referendum in June 2016 and voted against the triggering of Article 50 in February 2017.

References

External links
 
 Vicky Foxcroft's party profile at labour.org.uk
 Vicky Foxcroft's profile on the Labour Party website for Lewisham Deptford
 Vicky Foxcroft's blog
 Vicky Foxcroft's Twitter profile
 Vicky Foxcroft's LinkedIn profile
 Vicky Foxcroft's YouTube channel

1977 births
Living people
Alumni of De Montfort University
Councillors in the London Borough of Lewisham
English trade unionists
Female members of the Parliament of the United Kingdom for English constituencies
Labour Party (UK) councillors
Labour Party (UK) MPs for English constituencies
UK MPs 2015–2017
UK MPs 2017–2019
UK MPs 2019–present
English women trade unionists
21st-century British women politicians
21st-century English women
21st-century English people
Women councillors in England